Nagyvenyim is a village in Fejér county, Hungary.

Partnership: Altomünster (Germany)

External links 
 Street map 

Populated places in Fejér County